Straß im Straßertale is a town in the district of Krems-Land in Lower Austria in Austria.

Population

References

Cities and towns in Krems-Land District